is a women's football club based in Sakai and Osaka, Osaka. The team currently plays in the Nadeshiko League, the second division of women's football in Japan, but next season play in WE League from 2023–24.

History
Cerezo Osaka Ladies joined to WE League from 2023–24 season after approval of professional football. This is the last season of Nadeshiko League for 2022–23.

Squad

Current squad

Season-by-season records

Club staff

Transition of team name
Cerezo Osaka Ladies: (2010–2012)
Cerezo Osaka Sakai Ladies: (2013–present)

References

External links 
 Cerezo Osaka Sakai Ladies official site
 Japanese club teams

Women's football clubs in Japan
2012 establishments in Japan
Cerezo Osaka
Football clubs in Osaka